1st clan chief may refer to:
Sorley Boy MacDonnell
Gilleain na Tuaighe MacLean